Shi Jialuo (în , born 25 January 1993) is a Chinese foil fencer.

Career
At the age of 16 Shi reached the quarter-finals at the 2009 World Championships in Antalya after defeating Olympic champions Brice Guyart and Benjamin Kleibrink, but lost to Russia's Artem Sedov. In 2011 he made the quarter-finals in the Shanghai Grand Prix, which pushed him to the 36th place in world rankings, a career best as of 2015. He won a bronze medal in the 2012 World Military Fencing Championships in Rio de Janeiro.

Shi was part of the China team that win a bronze medal at the 2013 Asian Championships. With Chen Haiwei, Lei Sheng and Ma Jianfei he reached the final in the team event of the 2014 World Championships, but they were overcome 25–45 by France and came away with a silver medal.

References

Chinese male foil fencers
Living people
1993 births
Fencers from Fujian
Olympic fencers of China
Fencers at the 2016 Summer Olympics
Fencers at the 2018 Asian Games
Asian Games bronze medalists for China
Asian Games medalists in fencing
Medalists at the 2018 Asian Games
Left-handed fencers
21st-century Chinese people